Burgan-e Bala (also Romanized as Būrgān-e Bālā, Būrgān Bāla, and Būrgān-ye Bālā; also known as Būrgān and Būrkān) is a village in Arabkhaneh Rural District, Shusef District, Nehbandan County, South Khorasan Province, Iran. At the 2006 census, its population was 89, in 19 families.

References 

Populated places in Nehbandan County